The Canalul Morilor is a canal in the lowland area south of the river Crișul Alb in Arad County, western Romania. Constructed in the 19th century for water-mills, it is now used for irrigation. It takes water from the Crișul Alb near Berindia, flows more or less parallel to the Crișul Alb towards the west and discharges into the Crișul Alb in Vărșand. It passes through the communes Buteni, Bârsa, Bocsig, Ineu, Seleuș, Zărand, Olari, Chișineu-Criș, Socodor and Pilu. It intercepts several former left tributaries of the Crișul Alb, including Chișer, Rât and Budieru.

References

Canals in Romania
CCanalul Morilor